Textecution is an application developed for the T-Mobile G1 Google phone that restricts the user's ability to text message while driving. It is estimated that 46% of teens text message while driving, a potentially dangerous behavior.

How It Works
A GPS fix determines when the phone is traveling higher than 10 mph and Textecution shuts down the texting abilities. If a user is not driving, he or she can request permission to turn texting on. The parent can allow for the texting to be enabled in this case.

Reception 
Textecution has been reviewed by publications including TechCrunch, Wired, Gizmodo, GSM Nation, KTEN, and AOL Finance.

References

External links

Text messaging